Machine learning control (MLC) is a subfield of machine learning, intelligent control and control theory
which solves optimal control problems with methods of machine learning.
Key applications are complex nonlinear systems
for which linear control theory methods are not applicable.

Types of problems and tasks 
Four types of problems are commonly encountered.
 Control parameter identification: MLC translates to a parameter identification if the structure of the control law is given but the parameters are unknown. One example is the genetic algorithm for optimizing coefficients of a PID controller or discrete-time optimal control.
 Control design as regression problem of the first kind:  MLC approximates a general nonlinear mapping from sensor signals to actuation commands, if the sensor signals and the optimal actuation command are known for every state. One example is the computation of sensor feedback from a known full state feedback. A neural network is commonly used technique for this task.
 Control design as regression problem of the second kind: MLC may also identify arbitrary nonlinear control laws which minimize the cost function of the plant. In this case, neither a model, nor the control law structure,  nor the optimizing actuation command needs to be known. The optimization is only based on the control performance (cost function) as measured in the plant. Genetic programming is a powerful regression technique for this purpose.
 Reinforcement learning control: The control law may be continually updated over measured performance changes (rewards) using reinforcement learning.

MLC comprises, for instance, neural network control, 
genetic algorithm based control, 
genetic programming control,
reinforcement learning control, 
and has methodological overlaps with other data-driven control,
like artificial intelligence and robot control.

Applications 
MLC has been successfully applied
to many nonlinear control problems,
exploring unknown and often unexpected actuation mechanisms.
Example applications include

 Attitude control of satellites.
 Building thermal control.
 Feedback turbulence control.
 Remotely operated underwater vehicles.
 Many more engineering MLC application are summarized in the review article of PJ Fleming & RC Purshouse (2002).

As for all general nonlinear methods,
MLC comes with no guaranteed convergence, 
optimality or robustness for a range of operating conditions.

References

Further reading 

 Dimitris C Dracopoulos (August 1997) "Evolutionary Learning Algorithms for Neural Adaptive Control", Springer. .
Thomas Duriez, Steven L. Brunton & Bernd R. Noack (November 2016) "Machine Learning Control - Taming Nonlinear Dynamics and Turbulence", Springer. .

Machine learning
Control theory
Cybernetics